Carlisle is a town located northwest of Boston in Middlesex County, Massachusetts, United States. As of the 2020 U.S. Census, the town had a population of 5,237.

History
English colonists first settled the area now incorporated as 
the town of Carlisle in 1651 on parcels of land of the neighboring towns of Acton, Billerica, Chelmsford and Concord. Carlisle became a district of Concord in 1780 and was incorporated as a town by an act of the legislature in 1805.

Activities 
Carlisle contains a library, a country store, a book store, a dentist's office, an automated teller machine, many residential buildings, and the largest playground in the state of Massachusetts (Carlisle Castle). There are two ice cream stores: one of the four branches of Kimball Farms, and Great Brook Farm State Park which is home to the first robotic milking system in Massachusetts and serves ice cream made from the farm's milk. Great Brook Farm is also the site of one of the premiere cross-country ski touring centers in New England. On the east end of town there is an auto body shop and the former (closed in 2012) Blue Jay Recording Studio, where artists such as the Platters, Aerosmith, Aimee Mann, Amy Grant, Alice Cooper, Boston, John Williams and the Boston Pops, Buckwheat Zydeco, Billy Joel, Lauryn Hill, Rihanna, Roy Orbison, k. d. lang, Pat Metheny, Yo Yo Ma, Carly Simon, the Pussycat Dolls, Genesis and Lady Gaga have recorded.

The town newspaper, the Carlisle Mosquito, has appeared as the weekly independent newspaper of the town since 1972. It is a non-profit publication distributed free to all town residents. The paper includes local news, announcements, and logs.

The Gleason Public Library is one of the 36 libraries in the Merrimack Valley Library Consortium. Gleason Public Library also contains a seismograph.

Cultural organizations include the Carlisle Chamber Orchestra, the Carlisle Community Chorus, and the Savoyard Light Opera Company.

Carlisle Old Home Day has been held for over 100 years on the weekend prior to the Fourth of July as a free public event with family-friendly games and activities.

Geography
It borders the towns of Concord, Acton, Westford, Chelmsford, Billerica, and Bedford.

Conservation land makes up about a quarter of the town's area. Besides town-owned land overseen by the town's conservation committee, Carlisle is home to Great Brook Farm State Park and a portion of the Great Meadows National Wildlife Refuge neighboring the Concord River.

Demographics 
As of the census of 2000, there were 4,717 people, 1,618 households, and 1,372 families residing in the town. The racial makeup of the town was 93.47% White, 0.17% African American, 0.06% Native American, 4.69% Asian, 0.04% Pacific Islander, 0.13% from other races, and 1.29% from two or more races. Hispanic or Latino of any race were 1.19% of the population.

There were 1,618 households, out of which 46.4% had children under the age of 18 living with them, 78.6% were married couples living together, 4.7% had a female householder with no husband present, and 15.2% were non-families. 11.4% of all households were made up of individuals, and 4.9% had someone living alone who was 65 years of age or older.  The average household size was 2.92 and the average family size was 3.18.

In the town, the population was spread out, with 30.6% under the age of 18, 3.4% from 18 to 24, 23.3% from 25 to 44, 34.3% from 45 to 64, and 8.4% who were 65 years of age or older.  The median age was 42 years. For every 100 females, there were 98.3 males.  For every 100 females age 18 and over, there were 96.4 males.

The median income for a household in the town $176,228 (Average household income is $244,544). The per capita income for the town was $87,470.

Carlisle maintains a  zoning law on new development.

Climate

In a typical year, Carlisle, Massachusetts temperatures fall below 50°F (10°C) for 195 days per year. Annual precipitation is typically 45.6 inches (115.8 centimeters) per year (high in the US) and snow covers the ground 62 days per year or 17.0% of the year (high in the US). It may be helpful to understand the yearly precipitation by imagining 9 straight days of moderate rain per year. The humidity is below 60% for approximately 25.4 days or 7.0% of the year.

Education

Carlisle has one public K–8 school, the Carlisle Public School. High School students attend Concord Carlisle High School in Concord or private schools such as Middlesex School in Concord.

Notable people

 Sean Bielat, businessman and two time Republican candidate for United States Congress in Massachusetts's 4th congressional district
 Clairo, musician and recording artist
 John Berman, journalist and CNN anchor.

Notes

External links

Town of Carlisle official website
Carlisle.org, volunteer-run community website
The Carlisle Mosquito, town newspaper
Carlisle Conservation Foundation
History of Middlesex County, Massachusetts, compiled by Samuel Adams Drake, published 1879. Volume 1, page 359 Carlisle by B.F.Heald.

 
Towns in Middlesex County, Massachusetts
Towns in Massachusetts
1651 establishments in Massachusetts